The Nine Arches Bridge is the informal name of a viaduct over the River Dodder in Milltown, Dublin, Ireland. The Luas tram Green Line crosses the bridge. There is no access for pedestrians.

History
The bridge was completed in 1854 for the Harcourt Street railway line. The line was closed on 31 December 1958 and the bridge was left derelict for over 40 years until construction began on Luas tram line. Handrails were fitted to the side of the bridge and overhead power lines were added for the trams. The bridge was first used in testing in February 2004 and officially reopened on 30 June 2004.

Gallery

References

External links
 Photo of the bridge in 1986from South Dublin County Libraries.

Bridges in Dublin (city)